Malovsky is a rural locality (a settlement) in Bauntovsky District, Republic of Buryatia, Russia. The population was 1,508 as of 2010. There are 28 streets.

Geography 

References 

Rural localities in Bauntovsky District